Gorgeous George, real name George Wagner (1915–1963), was an American professional wrestler.

Gorgeous George may also refer to:

People with the nickname

Professional wrestling
Stephanie Bellars (born 1976), American professional wrestling valet billed as Gorgeous George in WCW
Gorgeous George III, real name Robert Kellum (born 1973), American professional wrestler, also known as "The Maestro".
"Gorgeous" George Gillette (1940-1989) manager of English masked professional wrestler Kendo Nagasaki

Others
George Galloway (born 1954), Scottish politician 
George Sisler (1893–1973), Hall of Fame baseball player
George Smathers (1913–2007), American lawyer and politician nicknamed "Gorgeous George"
Georg Gänswein (born 1956), Prefect of the Papal household of the Holy See

Other uses

Gorgeous George (album), 1994 album by Edwyn Collins
Gorgeous George (comics), a Marvel Comics character
Gorgeous George, a series of children's novels by Stuart Reid
Gorgeous George, a character in the Guy Ritchie movie Snatch

Lists of people by nickname